The 2018–19 Mississippi Valley State Delta Devils basketball team represented Mississippi Valley State University in the 2018–19 NCAA Division I men's basketball season. The Delta Devils were led by fifth-year head coach Andre Payne, and played their home games at the Harrison HPER Complex in Itta Bena, Mississippi as members of the Southwestern Athletic Conference. They finished the season 6–26 overall, 4–14 in SWAC play to finish in a tie for ninth place. They failed to qualify for the 2019 SWAC tournament, as only the top eight teams are eligible to participate.

Previous season 
The Delta Devils finished the 2017–18 season 4–28, 4–14 in SWAC play to finish in ninth place. Due to the ineligibility of Grambling State, the Delta Devils received the No. 8 seed in the SWAC tournament and lost to Arkansas–Pine Bluff in the quarterfinals.

Roster

Schedule and results 

|-
! colspan=9 style=|Exhibition

|-
!colspan=9 style=| Non-conference regular season

|-
!colspan=9 style=| SWAC regular season

See also 
Mississippi Valley State Devilettes basketball

References 

Mississippi Valley State
Mississippi Valley State Delta Devils basketball seasons
Mississippi Valley
Mississippi Valley